Bircham is a civil parish in the English county of Norfolk, which includes the villages of Great Bircham, Bircham Newton and Bircham Tofts

Bircham may also refer to

Place name
Bircham, Alberta, a small hamlet in southern Alberta, Canada
Bircham International University, an unaccredited distance education university
RAF Bircham Newton, a former Royal Air Force airfield in the west of the county of Norfolk in the United Kingdom

Surname
 Marc Bircham, English footballer
 Clive Bircham
 Barney Bircham